The 2016–17 James Madison Dukes women's basketball team represented James Madison University during the 2016–17 NCAA Division I women's basketball season. The Dukes, led by first year head coach Sean O'Regan, played their home games at the James Madison University Convocation Center and were members of the Colonial Athletic Association (CAA). They finished the season 26–9, 15–3 in CAA play to finish in second place. They advanced to the championship game of the CAA women's tournament where they lost to Elon. They received an automatic bid to the Women's National Invitation Tournament where they defeated Radford and Virginia in the first and second rounds before losing to Villanova in the third round.

Roster

Schedule

|-
!colspan=9 style="background:#450084; color:#C2A14D;"| Exhibition

|-
!colspan=9 style="background:#450084; color:#C2A14D;"| Non-conference regular season

|-
!colspan=9 style="background:#450084; color:#C2A14D;"| CAA regular season

|-
!colspan=9 style="background:#450084; color:#C2A14D;"| CAA Women's Tournament

|-
!colspan=9 style="background:#450084; color:#C2A14D;"| WNIT

Rankings

See also
 2016–17 James Madison Dukes men's basketball team

References

James Madison Dukes women's basketball seasons
James Madison
2017 Women's National Invitation Tournament participants